is the city hall of the city of Nagoya, Japan.

It is designed in the Imperial Crown style, a fusion Japanese and modern style. It survived the bombings of World War II and is registered as a Tangible Cultural Property of Japan.

It is located close to the Aichi Prefectural Government Office.

History 
The present main building was built on September 6, 1933.

Location 
1-1, Sannomaru 3-chome, Naka-ku, Nagoya, Japan (Postal code 460-8508).

External links 
 

Buildings and structures in Nagoya
City and town halls in Japan
Government of Nagoya
Government buildings completed in 1933
Tourist attractions in Nagoya
Imperial Crown Style architecture
1933 establishments in Japan